Sinanapis is a genus of Asian araneomorph spiders in the family Anapidae, first described by J. Wunderlich & D. X. Song in 1995.

Species
 it contains four species:
Sinanapis crassitarsa Wunderlich & Song, 1995 – China, Laos, Vietnam
Sinanapis longituba Lin & Li, 2012 – China (Hainan)
Sinanapis medogensis Zhang & Lin, 2018 – China
Sinanapis wuyi Jin & Zhang, 2013 – China

References

Anapidae
Araneomorphae genera
Spiders of Asia